The 2017-2018 season was the club's 69th season in history and their 24th consecutive season in the top flight of Bosnian football.

Players

Squad

(C)

(Captain)

(Captain)
(C)

(C)

(C)
(C)

Statistics

Kit

Friendlies

Competitions

Premier League

Regular season

League table

Matches

Championship round

League table

Matches

Cup of Bosnia and Herzegovina

Round of 32

UEFA Europa League

First qualifying round

References

FK Sarajevo seasons
Sarajevo